The 2019  PBA Tour season, the 60th season of play for the U.S. Professional Bowlers Association's ten-pin bowling tour, began in January 2019 with the PBA Hall of Fame Classic in Arlington, Texas. The season schedule had 27 singles title events, two doubles title events, and two non-title team events.

The 2019 season introduced major changes, with Fox Sports assuming the media and sponsorship rights to the PBA Tour, as well as the introduction of a revamped PBA Tour Playoffs as a 24-player, bracketed elimination tournament. Another big change came later in the year, when the PBA was purchased by Bowlero Corporation.

Media rights
On March 21, 2018, Fox Sports announced that it had acquired the television rights for the PBA Tour, replacing ESPN, with a commitment for 26 broadcasts on Fox Sports 1 and four on the Fox broadcast network beginning in 2019 (totalling 58 hours, in comparison to the 30 hours of coverage provided by ESPN linear channels in 2018). To launch its coverage, Fox broadcast an invitational event, the PBA Clash, on December 23, 2018. Fox will air four events per-season, including the CP3 PBA Celebrity Invitational (which aired on the afternoon of Super Bowl LIII). Fox and FS1 have aired 14 final rounds live during the 2019 season, as compared to the four live broadcasts aired on ESPN in 2018. Fox Sports also assumed the role of sponsorship sales for the tour. The PBA saw the deal as an effort to increase media exposure for the tour and its top players.

In a similar manner to Fox's 2016 acquisition of NHRA drag racing, Fox focused on developing new on-air features and technology to improve viewer understanding of the intricacies of the sport, and additional shoulder content. One such feature is StrikeTrack, a graphic (based on technology from the company Kegel) that displays the trajectory, speed, and rotation (RPM) of the ball as it travels down the lane. Broadcasting & Cable considered this feature akin to the infamous "FoxTrax" used during Fox's National Hockey League coverage in the 1990s.

On August 15, the PBA and Fox announced the return of the PBA Clash, the fifth 2019 event to air on Fox television. The November 3 broadcast (tape-delayed from October 21) will feature the top eight 2019 money leaders through September 21 vying for a $50,000 top prize.

The PBA reported ratings growth in the first year of its contract; the Tournament of Champions finals broadcast on Fox was its highest-rated first-run telecast of the season, at 1,132,000 viewers. Including first-run and rerun broadcasts, the association reported that total viewership of all PBA telecasts on Fox networks through the PBA Tour Playoffs had seen an 85% increase in viewership over 2018, with the ten playoffs broadcasts being seen by at least 7.941 million.

Tournament schedule
On August 28, 2018, the PBA announced that all events televised on Fox and FS1, except for the USBC Masters, will only be open to members of the association. The USBC Masters has traditionally allowed qualifying USBC members who may not be PBA members to participate, and will continue to do so. PBA Xtra Frame Tour, PBA Regional Tour and PBA50 Tour events will also continue to allow qualifying non-members to participate.

The 2019 PBA Tournament of Champions and PBA Players Championship majors were held in February. In order to include it in Fox's new contract, the PBA's World Series of Bowling X (which included three standard PBA title events and the PBA World Championship — the season's third major) was postponed for 2018 and moved to March 2019, with live finals broadcasts occurring in prime time across four consecutive nights. For the first three majors of 2019 and the PBA Indianapolis Open, Fox and the PBA offered a $1 million bonus for any player who rolls a 300 game in the televised title match. Of the PBA's 26 televised 300 games, only two came in the title match, and neither of these was in a major tournament.

The season's fourth major, the USBC Masters, took place March 26–April 1 in Las Vegas. The U.S. Open, the season's final major, was contested October 23–30 in Mooresville, North Carolina.

A new PBA Playoffs event featured the top 24 players in points after the first 13 events of the 2019 season (through the USBC Masters), and offered a $100,000 top prize. The single-elimination tournament was set up in a split format, with the elimination rounds held April 8–10 and the final four competing in two live broadcasts on June 1 and 2.

The PBA League team event, which has been held since the 2012–13 season, continued into 2019. For the first time, all rounds of this tournament aired in live broadcasts, between July 16 and July 18.

As in the previous two seasons, CBS Sports Network carried the PBA Tour Finals, which took place July 20 and 21 in Las Vegas. (PBA Commissioner Tom Clark later announced an agreement with CBS Sports Network to cover the PBA Tour finals through the 2022 PBA season.) The tournament retained a similar format as in 2018, with eight top players seeded into two groups of four. The main difference for 2019 is that the eight players were determined based on Tour points ranking since the beginning of the 2018 season. (In previous PBA Tour Finals, the eight bowlers were chosen and seeded based on Tour earnings, not points.)  CBS Sports Network broadcast an unprecedented nine hours of live coverage over the two days.

The PBA Xtra Frame summer tour returned with some additional incentives. Renamed the USBC Cup tour, this consisted of nine title events in seven cities, beginning with the PBA Lubbock Sports Shootout in late June and concluding with the three-event PBA Summer Swing on August 24–31. All events aired live on the FloBowling Xtra Frame webcast service. The top five PBA members in points over these nine events shared in a $40,000 bonus pool, with the top points earner (Sean Rash) winning a $20,000 bonus and the honor of USBC Cup champion. In addition, the top eight PBA members over these events earned berths in the FloBowling PBA ATX Summer Tour Finals on September 21 and the PBA China Tiger Cup on November 19–21. In the China Tiger Cup, the eight players will join eight Chinese PBA members in singles and team matches at the first PBA event to ever be held in China.

2019 Highlights

Player awards
Player awards for the 2019 season were announced on December 11, 2019.

 Chris Schenkel PBA Player of the Year: Jason Belmonte
 Harry Golden PBA Rookie of the Year: Mykel Holliman
 Steve Nagy PBA Sportsmanship Award: Martin Larsen
 Tony Reyes PBA Community Service Award: Chuck Gardner

Records and additional highlights
 Jason Belmonte won four tournaments on the season, two of them majors. With his second major win of the season at the PBA World Championship, Belmonte surpassed Earl Anthony and Pete Weber to become the PBA's all-time leader in major tournament wins (11).
 Norm Duke won back-to-back tournaments at the PBA Indianapolis Open and PBA Jonesboro Open, becoming the third bowler in history to reach the 40 career titles plateau, after Walter Ray Williams Jr. and Earl Anthony.
 After finishing runner-up in three previous major tournaments, Jakob Butturff finally won his first major at the USBC Masters.
 Kristopher Prather won the largest prize check of the season ($100,000) at the inaugural PBA Tour Playoffs. Qualifying as the #9 seed, Prather defeated #7 seed Bill O'Neill in the double-elimination final on June 2.

Tournament summary
The 2019 PBA tournament schedule is shown below. Major tournaments are in bold. Career PBA title numbers for winners are shown in parenthesis (#). Prize money is shown in US dollars.

Tour points are awarded for most events. Besides the season-ending Harry Smith PBA Points Winner award, points are one consideration for Player of the Year voting, and also affect eligibility for the PBA Playoffs, PBA Tour Finals (combined with 2018 points), PBA China Tiger Cup (USBC Cup event points only) and the 2020 DHC PBA Japan Invitational. Points for tournaments are awarded differently based on a "tier" system. The tier of each qualifying tournament is shown in the Notes column on the tournament schedule, and is explained below.

 Tier 3: PBA short format or limited field tournaments (2500 points for first, and descending thereafter)
 Tier 2: PBA standard tournaments with a fully open field (double the points of Tier 3 events)
 Tier 1: PBA major tournaments (triple the points of Tier 3 events)

References

External links
PBA 2018 Season Schedule
PBA 2018 ESPN TV Schedule

Professional Bowlers Association seasons
2019 in bowling